Lost and Found is the debut extended play (EP) by South Korean singer-songwriter IU. It was released by LOEN Entertainment on September 23, 2008. IU collaborated with lyricist and producer Choi Gap-won, who had previously produced songs including "Amnesia" by Gummy, "Incurable Disease" by Wheesung, and "Toc Toc Toc" by Lee Hyori. Lee Jong-hoon of Soul-Shop and the singer Mario additionally worked on the title song, "Lost Child".

Background
The music video for "Lost Child", featuring Thunder, was uploaded through LOEN Entertainment's official YouTube channel on July 19, 2011, after the singer rose to stardom with the success of "Good Day".

Track listing

Charts

Awards and nominations

References

External links
 

2008 debut EPs
IU (singer) EPs
Korean-language EPs
Kakao M EPs